ACTC1 encodes cardiac muscle alpha actin. This isoform differs from the alpha actin that is expressed in skeletal muscle, ACTA1. Alpha cardiac actin is the major protein of the thin filament in cardiac sarcomeres, which are responsible for muscle contraction and generation of force to support the pump function of the heart.

Structure 

Cardiac alpha actin is a 42.0 kDa protein composed of 377 amino acids. Cardiac alpha actin is a filamentous protein extending from a complex mesh with cardiac alpha-actinin (ACTN2) at Z-lines towards the center of the sarcomere. Polymerization of globular actin (G-actin) leads to a structural filament (F-actin) in the form of a two-stranded helix. Each actin can bind to four others. The atomic structure of monomeric actin was solved by Kabsch et al., and closely thereafter this same group published the structure of the actin filament. Actins are highly conserved proteins; the alpha actins are found in muscle tissues and are a major constituent of the contractile apparatus. Cardiac (ACTC1) and skeletal (ACTA1) alpha actins differ by only four amino acids (Asp4Glu, Glu5Asp, Leu301Met, Ser360Thr; cardiac/skeletal). The actin monomer has two asymmetric domains; the larger inner domain comprised by sub-domains 3 and 4, and the smaller outer domain by sub-domains 1 and 2. Both the amino and carboxy-termini lie in sub-domain 1 of the outer domain.

Function 

Actin is a dynamic structure that can adapt two states of flexibility, with the greatest difference between the states occurring as a result of movement within sub-domain 2. Myosin binding increases the flexibility of actin, and cross-linking studies have shown that myosin subfragment-1 binds to actin amino acid residues 48-67 within actin sub-domain 2, which may account for this effect.

It has been suggested that the ACTC1 gene has a role during development. Experiments in chick embryos found an association between ACTC1 knockdown and a reduction in the atrial septa.

Clinical significance 

Polymorphisms in ACTC1 have been linked to Dilated Cardiomyopathy in a small number of Japanese patients. Further studies in patients from South Africa found no association. The E101K missense mutation has been associated with Hypertrophic Cardiomyopathy and Left Ventricular Noncompaction. Another mutation has in the ACTC1 gene has been associated with atrial septal defects.

References

Further reading

External links 
 Mass spectrometry characterization of human ACTC1 at COPaKB
  GeneReviews/NIH/NCBI/UW entry on Familial Hypertrophic Cardiomyopathy Overview
 

Human proteins